The Drumheller Falcons were a Junior A ice hockey team in the Alberta Junior Hockey League (AJHL) based in Drumheller, Alberta.

The Falcons joined the AJHL in the 1971–72 season as the league's seventh team after acquiring the assets of the Ponoka Stampeders franchise that ceased operations after the 1969–70 season.

The Falcons had their best season in 1974-75.  They finished second overall during the regular season, advanced through the post season to the AJHL finals, going the full seven games before losing the championship to the Spruce Grove Mets, who would go on to win that year's Centennial Cup as the best Junior A hockey team in Canada, with no other challenger good enough to take them to a full 7-game series.

The Falcons would struggle with attendance the following season, then took a three-year leave of absence.

The Falcons returned in 1979, however were consistently overmatched, winning just 29 games total between 1979 and 1983.  The Falcons folded midway through the 1982-83 season having lost every game they played that year.  The Falcons still hold the record for longest losing streak spanning two seasons at 35; a record stopped only by the team's demise.

Four Falcons alumni went on to play in the National Hockey League: Merlin Malinowski, Jim Nill, Bryan Maxwell and John Hilworth.

Drumheller would not get a second chance in the AJHL until 2003, when the Drumheller Dragons were founded as an expansion team.

Season-by-season record

Note: GP = Games played, W = Wins, L = Losses, T = Ties, Pts = Points, GF = Goals for, GA = Goals against

†Folded with a record of 0-24-0. The team forfeited two games following its demise.

Playoffs
1972 DNQ
1973 Lost Semi-final
Calgary Canucks defeated Drumheller Falcons 4-games-to-1 with 1 tie
1974 DNQ
1975 Lost Final
Drumheller Falcons defeated Taber Golden Suns 4-games-to-1
Spruce Grove Mets defeated Drumheller Falcons 4-games-to-3
1976 DNQ
1977-79 Did Not Participate
1980 DNQ
1981 Lost Quarter-final
Calgary Spurs defeated Drumheller Falcons 3-games-to-none
1982 DNQ
1983 Did Not Finish Season

See also
 List of ice hockey teams in Alberta

References
Alberta Junior Hockey League website
AJHL Annual Guide & Record Book 2006-07

Defunct Alberta Junior Hockey League teams
Defunct ice hockey teams in Alberta
Defunct junior ice hockey teams in Canada
Ice hockey clubs established in 1971
Drumheller
1971 establishments in Alberta
1983 disestablishments in Alberta
Sports clubs disestablished in 1983